Librado Andrade Ornelas (born September 2, 1978) is a Mexican former professional boxer who competed from 1999 to 2013, and challenged three times for a super middleweight world title between 2007 and 2009. His brother Enrique Ornelas is also a professional boxer.

Professional career
Though ranked in the top twenty-five in the division for the last couple of years, Andrade has faced little real opposition leading up to his bout against WBA/WBC champion Mikkel Kessler. Prior to the Kessler fight, he was best known for his first round knockout of former contender Richard Grant and defeating former middleweight champion Otis Grant. He also gained some recognition for being asked to be Bernard Hopkins sparring partner in preparation for Hopkins' rematch with Jermain Taylor.  Andrade declined this request at the behest of his manager Al Haymon, who told Andrade: "You can't have the mentality of being a helper for another fighter. You have to have the mentality of a champion.". In 2005, Kessler himself had used Andrade for a three-round sparring session while training in Los Angeles for a fight with Anthony Mundine.

In the Kessler fight, Andrade showed an incredible ability to endure an all-out assault.  Kessler landed 348 punches, almost all to the head of Andrade. Throughout the punishment, Andrade showed no facial, or mental wear and tear and continued to press the fight each round by coming forward, at Kessler.  Prior to the last round, the two fighters, in a rare display of respect in boxing, embraced each other rather than simply touching gloves.  The judges at ringside, Tom Kaczmarek, Tom Miller and John Keane, all had the bout score 120-108 in favor of Mikkel Kessler. The fight was aired live on HBO's Boxing After Dark.

On October 6, 2007 on a Marco Antonio Barrera vs Manny Pacquiao II main event undercard fight, Andrade won the vacant USBA 168-pound title with a 7th-round TKO of Yusaf Mack.

On March 22, 2008, Andrade scored the biggest victory of his career against former IBF number one contender Robert Stieglitz of Germany.  Andrade dominated the fight from the opening round with uppercuts and body shots that left Stieglitz continually on the defensive. Landing a solid right in the eighth round, Stieglitz was left staggered. Andrade followed up with flurry of shots that led to referee stop the fight, giving Andrade a TKO victory. As this was an eliminator bout, Andrade has been lined up for a  fight with IBF Super Middleweight champion Lucian Bute.

Andrade vs. Bute
The IBF championship fight on October 24, 2008 saw Bute dominate nearly every round. Andrade demonstrated his endurance but could not break Bute's strategy.  However, in the 12th round, Andrade landed several effective combinations that rendered Bute groggy and exhausted.  Bute nearly hit the canvas a couple of times on his own and finally got knocked down by a strong right hand with two seconds left. Controversy ensued as the referee Marlon B. Wright interrupted the count to warn Andrade, because according to his interpretation, Andrade did not remain in a neutral corner. After the fight, the referee declared that in his opinion, Bute would not have beaten the count had Andrade not moved out of his neutral corner to gain an unfair advantage. Andrade said: “He ( Bute ) was clearly out. It was outrageous! If this is the way to lose a fight, then this is the way I want to lose. I know I won the fight because I came with the intent to knock him out and I did.”

Andrade defeated Vitali Tsypko in Montreal on April 4, 2009, in an IBF Super Middleweight eliminator, thus prompting a rematch with Lucian Bute, which took place November 28, 2009 in Quebec City.

Bute defeated Andrade by KO in the fourth round in the following rematch, by an uppercut to the body, which followed shortly after a left jab knocked Andrade out the floor for the first time.

In Quebec City on ESPN's Friday Night Fights, Librado beat Eric Lucas. The fight was stopped due to cuts over Eric's left eye, Andrade was leading on all three scorecards.

Professional boxing record

Personal
Andrade was born in Guanajuato, Mexico. His family emigrated to La Habra, California when he was ten years old. Andrade was previously married and has two children.

During an HBO telecast of his fight against Yusaf Mack, it was reported that Andrade lost 14 of his 16 amateur bouts. At one point, Andrade worked the morning shifts at a Jack in the Box fast food restaurant while training at the gym in the afternoon.

References

External links

Living people
1978 births
Super-middleweight boxers
Boxers from Guanajuato
Mexican male boxers